Locker is the surname of:

Berl Locker (1887–1972), Zionist activist and Israeli politician
Bob Locker (born 1938), retired Major League Baseball pitcher
Dale Locker (1929–2011), Democratic member of the Ohio House of Representatives
Edward Hawke Locker (1777–1849), English watercolourist and administrator of the Royal Naval Hospital, Greenwich
Harel Locker (born 1965), Israeli lawyer and civil servant
Jake Locker (born 1988), National Football League quarterback
William Locker (1866–1952), English footballer and cricketer
William Locker (Royal Navy officer) (1731–1800), Royal Navy commodore
Yohanan Locker (born 1956), Israeli general